The McAlpine Baronetcy, of Knott Park in the County of Surrey, is a title in the Baronetage of the United Kingdom. It was created in 1918 for Robert McAlpine, a Scottish civil engineer and the founder of Sir Robert McAlpine Ltd.

McAlpine baronets, of Knott Park (1918)
Sir Robert McAlpine, 1st Baronet (1847–1934)
Sir Robert McAlpine, 2nd Baronet (1868–1934)
Sir Alfred Robert McAlpine, 3rd Baronet (1907–1968)
Sir Thomas George Bishop McAlpine, 4th Baronet (1901–1983)
Sir (Robert) Edwin McAlpine, 5th Baronet (1907–1990) (created Baron McAlpine of Moffat in 1980)
Sir William Hepburn McAlpine, 6th Baronet (1936–2018)
Sir Andrew William McAlpine, 7th Baronet (b. 1960)

The heir apparent is the present holder's son, Frederick William Edwin McAlpine (b. 1993)

Other family members
Several other members of the McAlpine family have also gained distinction:
 Sir Malcolm McAlpine (1877–1967), third son of the 1st Baronet, was chairman of the family firm and a noted racehorse owner. His son, Sir Robin McAlpine (1906–1993), was also chairman of the firm and a prominent racehorse owner.
 Sir Alfred McAlpine (1881–1944), fourth son of the 1st Baronet, established his own construction firm (Alfred McAlpine plc) in 1935.
 Douglas McAlpine (1890–1981), sixth son of the 1st Baronet, was a distinguished neurologist. His son Christopher McAlpine (1919–2008) was a diplomat and banker.
 Edwin McAlpine, the second son of the second son of the 1st Baronet, ran the family firm during its highly successful period creating nuclear power stations and was created a life peer as Baron McAlpine of Moffat in 1980 before succeeding as 5th Baronet in 1983.
 Alistair McAlpine, second son of the 5th Baronet, was created a life peer as Baron McAlpine of West Green in 1984.

References

Kidd, Charles, Williamson, David (editors). Debrett's Peerage and Baronetage (1990 edition). New York: St Martin's Press, 1990.

Baronetcies in the Baronetage of the United Kingdom